Senator Shackelford may refer to:

Jack Shackelford (1790–1857), Alabama State Senate
John Williams Shackelford (1844–1883), North Carolina State Senate